Alexis Martínez (born 19 May 1991 in Salamanca, Guanajuato) is a Mexican rifle shooter. She competed in the 50 m rifle 3 positions event at the 2012 Summer Olympics, where she placed 39th.

References

1991 births
Living people
Mexican female sport shooters
Olympic shooters of Mexico
Shooters at the 2012 Summer Olympics
People from Salamanca, Guanajuato
Sportspeople from Guanajuato
Shooters at the 2015 Pan American Games
Pan American Games competitors for Mexico